Or Noir ("Black Gold") is a series of albums by Kaaris with three albums issued to date: the original Or Noir (2013), Or Noir Part II (2014) and Or Noir Part 3 (2019).

Or Noir

Or Noir is a 2013 album release by French rapper Kaaris signed with Tallac Records, a label established by rapper Booba. Or noir his major album on Therapy Music / AZ / Universal Music was on 21 October 2013 after Kaaris' initial success with album Z.E.R.O in 2012 released independently.

Track list
"Bizon" (3:15)
"Zoo" (4:48)
"Ciroc" (4:21)
"Mbm" (3:16)
"Binks" (4:15)
"Je bibi" (5:18)
"Bouchon de liège" (4:24)
"Paradis ou enfer" (4:53)
"L.E.F" (featuring Booba) (3:47)
"Dès le départ" (4:06)
"Pas de remède" (3:38)
"63" (4:11)
"Bébé" (3:26)
"Plus rien" (3:50)
"Or noir" (3:11)
"Tu me connais" (4:05)
"2 et demi" (4:50)

Charts

Or Noir Part II

In 2014, Kaaris released the follow up Or Noir Part II after the release of the original album. The album released 3 months after the release of Or Noir was on Therapy Music Records online on 28 February 2014 followed by physical release on Capitol Records on 3 March 2014. The new album contained 11 additional tracks.

Track list
"Intro" (2:51)
"Sombre" (2:37)
"S.E.V.R.A.N" (4:22)
"Comment je fais" (4:05)
"À l'heure" (4:25)
"Juste" (3:57)
"Chargé" (4:39)
"Pablito" (3:10)
"Killé" (4:26)
"Je remplis l'sac" (3:33)
"À la barrière" (4:39)

Charts

Or Noir Part 3

In 2019, Kaaris released a second follow up Or Noir Part 3 after 4 years of the release of the follow-up Or Noir Part II.

Track list
"Chien de la casse" (4:09)	
"Monsieur Météo" (2:50)	
"Briganté" (feat. Mac Tyer & Sofiane) (4:18)	
"Gun Salute" (3:29)	
"Golf7 R" (3:57)	
"Livraison" (2:30)	
"Aieaieouille" (3:17)	
"Débrouillard" (2:56)	
"Détails" (2:45)	
"Ça on l'a" (2:44)	
"Cigarette" (feat. SCH) (3:23)	
"Tout était écrit" (2:53)	
"Dévalisé" (3:08)	
"Douane" (3:15)	
"Comme un refrain" (3:14)

References

2013 albums
2014 albums
French-language albums